Francisco Salgado Zenha GCL (2 May 1923, Braga – 1 November 1993, Lisbon) was a Portuguese left-wing politician and lawyer. 

As a student at the University of Coimbra, he was elected president of the Academic Association of Coimbra, being dismissed some months after because he refused to participate in a demonstration of support to the Estado Novo regime. Some time after, in 1945, he became one of the founders of the youth wing of the Movement of Democratic Unity (Portuguese: Movimento de Unidade Democrática – Juvenil or "MUD-J"), a movement that congregated almost all the opposition movements to the Portuguese Fascist regime. His "subversive" actions lead him to prison for several times.

Later, he supported the presidential candidacy of Norton de Matos, and it was at this time that he met Mário Soares. Some years after he supported another democratic candidate to the manipulated elections, Humberto Delgado. After that he joined several Socialist movements, and in 1973, he was among the founders of the Socialist Party. As an anti-fascist he became notable for defending in court many people accused of anti-fascist and anti-colonialist activities.

After the Carnation Revolution, he was Minister of Justice in the first, second, third and fourth provisional governments and Minister of Finance in the fifth. He was member of the commission that made the review of the judiciary composition with the Holy See that, for example, legalized divorce in Portugal. Between 1974 and 1982, he was member of the direction of the Socialist Party and member of its Parliamentary Group.

In 1980, he started a dissidence with his old friend Mário Soares because the Party's support to Ramalho Eanes in the presidential election. 

In 1986, he was a presidential candidate supported by the Portuguese Communist Party and the Democratic Renovator Party, but even supported by these two parties he failed to reach the second round and thereafter virtually left the Portuguese political scene.

He died on 1 November 1993.

1923 births
1993 deaths
People from Braga
Portuguese anti-fascists
Candidates for President of Portugal
Socialist Party (Portugal) politicians
Finance ministers of Portugal
Government ministers of Portugal
Justice ministers of Portugal
20th-century Portuguese lawyers
University of Coimbra alumni